Venkateswara Temple is an important Vaishnavite temple situated in the hill town of Tirumala in Chittoor district of Andhra Pradesh, India. The Temple is dedicated to Lord Venkateswara, an incarnation of Vishnu, who is believed to be appeared here to save mankind from trials and troubles of Kali Yuga. The temple is situated at a height of 853 meters on Tirumala Hills which are part of Seshachalam Hills and is constructed in Dravidian Architectural Style.

Maha dwaram

 Maha Dwaram is the main entrance of the Temple. It provides access from outside of temple to Sampangi Pradakshinam which are separated by outer compound wall(Maha Prakaram).  A five storied  gopuram(Temple Tower) of 50 feet was built on this entrance with seven Kalasams at its apex.  It is also known as ‘Padikavali’ or ‘SimhaDwaram’. On either side of this entrance there are two panchaloha(metal) statues dedicated for Sankanidhi and Padmanidhi who are believed to be guardians of navanidhi(Treasures of Lord Venkateswara).

Sampangi pradakshina

 The area which circumambulates the outer and inner compound walls is called Sampangi Pradakshinam. In olden days Magnolia champaca Flowers (Telugu:Sampangi) were grown in this area hence it got the name Sampangi Pradakshinam. Sampangi Pradakshinam includes Krishnadevarayala Mandapam(Pratima Mandapam), Addala Mandapam, Ranganayaka Mandapam, Tirumalaraya Mandapam, Dwajasthambha Mandapam, Kalyanotsava Mandapam, Ugranam (Store house), Balipetam(Altar), Kshetra palaka sila, Tulabharam. It also includes idols of Vijayanagara Kings Sri Krishnadevarayalu and his two consorts, Tirumala Devi and Chinnadevi, Venkatapatirayalu,  Lala khemaramu, Lala’s mother Mata Mohana Devi and Lala’s wife Pita Bibi. Dwajastambam- the golden flagstaff  is found in between Maha dwaram and Vendi vakili in Dwajastambha mandapam. While entering or leavingInner sanctorum one has to encircumbulate Dwajastambam including Lord Venkateswara. During Sri Venkateswara Brahmotsavams the imprint of garuda is hoisted on this flagstaff inviting all Gods and Goddesses to the festival. During the invasion of Srirangam by Malik Kafur in 1310–11 AD, the Ranganayaka Mandapam of the temple served as the shelter for the presiding deity of Srirangam, Ranganatha Swamy.

Vendi Vakili
Vendi Vakili (Silver Entrance in Telugu) is the second entrance of the temple which is provided through inner compound wall and leads to Vimana Pradakhinam. This entrance is also known as 'Nadimipadikavali'.  The inner compound wall separates Sampangi Pradakshinam and Vimana Pradakshinam.  The doors of this entrance are plated with Silver and hence the name.  A three storied Gopuram was built over this entrance with seven kalisams during the twelfth and thirteenth centuries.

Vimana pradakshina

 Vendivakili leads to Vimana Pradakshinam. Vimana Pradakshinam is the area which circumambulates Ananda Nilayam Vimana Gopuram or Sanctum sanctorum or Main Shrine. Angapradakshina Seva will be performed in this area and hence this path is also called Anga pradakshina Margam. Just after entering the Vimana pradakshinam opposite to Vendivakili and behind the Garuda Mandapam there are small idols of Sri Varadaraja Swamy, Sri Ranganatha Swamu in sleeping posture over Adisesha and Sri Venkateswara Swamy plated in gold. Vimana Pradakshina includes small shrines dedicated to Varadaraja Swamy Temple to the right of Vendi vakili facing towards west and Yoga Narasimha Swamy Temple to the left of Vendi vakili also facing west. Other Rooms include Potu(main kitchen), Bangaru Bavi(golden well), Ankurarpana Mandapam, Yagasala, Nanala (coins) and Notla (Paper notes) Parkamani, Almyrah of Sandal paste (Chandanapu ara), cell of records, Sannidhi Bhashyakarulu - the seat of Sri Ramanuja, Lords’s hundi and the seat of Vishvaksena. Devotees will have darshan of ‘Vimana Venkateswara Swamy’ residing on Ananda Nilayam from Sampangi Pradakshinam. All the small temples in this path way are called ‘Chutttu Gullu’(Sub-shrines encircling the main shrine).

Ananda Nilayam Vimanam

The Ananda Nilayam is a monumental tower with a golden roof. Its inner temple or vimanam houses the main deity, Lord Sri Venkateswara. The deity stands directly beneath a gilt dome called the Ananda Nilaya Divya Vimana. This exquisitely wrought deity, called the Mulaberam, is believed to be self-manifested, and no human being is known to have installed it in the shrine. The Lord wears a gold crown with a large emerald embedded in the front. On special occasions, he is adorned with a diamond crown. The Lord has a thick double tilaka drawn on his forehead, which screens his eyes. His ears are decorated with golden earrings. The right hand is pointing to his lotus feet. His left hand is akimbo. His body is dressed with yellow clothing tied with gold string and a gold belt with gold bells. He has a yajnopavita (sacred thread) flowing down crosswise from his left shoulder. He bears Lakshmi Devi on his right chest and Padmavathi Devi on his left chest. His feet are covered with gold frames and decked with gold anklets. A curved gold belt encompasses his legs. The Ananda Nilaya Divya Vimana was covered with gilt copper plates and surmounted with a golden vase in the 13th century, during the reign of the Vijayanagara king Yadava Raya.The ancient and sacred temple of Sri Venkateswara is located on the seventh peak, Venkatachala (Venkata Hill) of the Tirupati Hill, and lies on the southern banks of Sri Swami Pushkarini. It is by the Lord's presidency over Venkatachala, that He has received the appellation, Venkateswara (Lord of the Venkata Hill). He is also called the Lord of the Seven Hills.

Bangaru vakili
Tirumamani Mandapam is the mandapam in front of bangaru vakili and is constructed in the year 1417 AD by madhavadasar. From the Tirumamani Mandapam, one can enter the Bangaru vakili (translates to Golden Entrance) to reach the inner sanctum sanctorum. There are two tall copper images of the dwarapalakas Jaya and Vijaya on either side of the door. The thick wooden door is covered with gilt plates depicting the dasavataram of Sri Maha Vishnu. The doorway is directly in line with the Padi Kavali and the Vendi Vakili(Meaning Silver Corridor in Telugu). It admits pilgrims to the Snapana Mandapam. Suprabhatam is sung in front of this door.

Garbhagriha
 and koluvu Srinivasa next to Rama 
The Garbhagruha or sanctum sanctorum is where the idol of Lord Sri Venkateswara is placed. The idol stands majestically in the Garbha Gruha, directly beneath a gilt-dome called the "Ananda Nilaya Divya Vimana". This idol, called the Mulaberam, is believed to be self-manifested. As there is no known sculptor possessing the capability to sculpt idols of god so proportionately. Further, no human being is known to have installed it in the shrine.

The idol of the Lord wears a gold crown (Kiritam), which has a large emerald embedded on its front. On special occasions, it is replaced with a diamond kiritam. On the forehead of the idol, two thick patches of tilak drawn with refined camphor, almost covers the eyes of the idol. In between the two white patches is a Kasturitilakam made of saffron.

Golden makara kundalas hang on the ears of the idol. The palm of its raised right hand is embedded with a gem-set Sudarshana Chakra and the left palm with the Holy Cone. The slightly outstretched front right hand, has its fingers pointing toward the feet, as if the Lord is the only recourse to his devotees to dissolve in him and enjoy eternal bliss. The akimbo of the front left hand implies lord's protection to devotees and to show that the Samsara Sagara (Ocean of Life) is never deeper than to hip's height, if they seek his refuge.

The body of the Idol is spun with a Gold-stringed-Pitambaram, with a belt of golden-bells. The idol is decorated with precious ornaments. It has a sacred thread flowing down, crossing from the left shoulder. It bears Goddess Lakshmi on the right chest and Sri Padmavathi Devi on the left. Nagaabharanam ornaments are on both shoulders of the idol. The lotus feet are covered with gold frames and decked with clinging gold anklets. A strong curved belt of gold encompasses the legs. During abhishekam, we can have darshan of Goddess Lakshmi.

The Ananda Nilaya Divya Vimana was covered with gilt copper plates and covered with a golden vase, in the thirteenth century, during the reign of the Vijayanagara king, Yadava Raya.

Pilgrims are not allowed to enter the Garbha Gruha (beyond Kulasekhara padi (path)).

Pushkarni

Swami Pushkarni is the temple pond located on the northern side of the main temple. The pond which is spread over 1.5 acres is believed to be brought by Garuda from Vaikuntham to Tirumala Hills and hence considered most sacred. The tank had a mandapam at its centre which was constructed by Saluva King Narasimha Raya in 1468. A harathi will be given to the Pushkarni daily during evening by Temple priests. Every year Sri Venkateswara Annual Theppotsavam (Float festival) is conducted in this pond, where the processional deities of the temple are taken float over the pond. Chakrasnanam- a celestial bath to Chakrathalwar, Malayappa and his concerts- is conducted at this pond during the last day of Srivari Brahmotsavams.

Akhilandam
Akhilandam also known as Akhandam is the area in front of main temple where huge lamps are installed. Devotees will offer karpuram(camphor) and coconuts to Venkateswara at this place after darshan. From this point one can have a complete view of the temple. Akhandam has huge lamps, two iron rails to break coconuts and two huge coconut hundis where devotees can offer the coconuts.

See also
Venkateswara Temple, Tirumala
Dravidian architecture

References 

Tirumala Venkateswara Temple
Tirupati